Michael Price (born 2 June 1966 in Nuneaton) is a retired English professional snooker player. He turned professional in 1988. He was Ronnie O'Sullivan's opponent when O'Sullivan scored the fastest 147 break in the game's history, at the 1997 World Championship. O'Sullivan won the match 10–6.

At the 1990 Benson & Hedges Satellite Championships, Price became only the third player to compile three consecutive century breaks in professional competition, when making contributions of 139, 137, 100 in beating former World number 2 Tony Knowles 5–4. Along with 1997, he also qualified for the World Championships in 1992 and 1996, reaching the second round in 1992 by beating Dennis Taylor 10–6 in the first round before losing in the second round, 10–13, to Alan McManus. In 1996, he lost to McManus again in the first round, 8–10. He peaked at #17 in the world rankings and remained in the top 32 until 1999. Price's best performance at a ranking event came at the 1993 European Open, where he beat Dave Harold, Willie Thorne, Joe Johnson and Mark Johnston-Allen to reach the semi-finals, where he lost 3–6 against reigning World Champion Stephen Hendry. He retired in 2004. He is now a maths teacher and plays local league snooker.

References

English snooker players
Living people
1966 births
Sportspeople from Nuneaton